

Location
Kumasi Girls is located at Abrepo, a suburb of Kumasi in the Ashanti region of Ghana. The school is adjacent to the County hospital.

History

The school was started as a private secondary school for girls by Caxton Williams, a Sierra Leonean in 1953.
Kumasi Girls' Senior High School (KUGISS) was first situated at Susanso, near Bomso Junction on the Kumasi-Accra road. In the early 1960s, the proprietor moved the school to Old Tafo where it remained in rented premises until 1992 when the school was moved to its present and permanent site at Abrepo. The government took over the administration of the school in the year 1963.

Alliance
Kumasi Girls maintains an ongoing alliance with their boys' school, Kumasi High School called MMRAHEMMAA.

References

External links

High schools in Ghana
Education in Kumasi
Girls' schools in Ghana
Educational institutions established in 1953
1953 establishments in Gold Coast (British colony)